Joan Rose Dwyer  (16 May 1940 – 11 September 2019) was an Australian lawyer, barrister, solicitor, Chairperson, and Tribunal member.

Born in Melbourne on 16 May 1940, Dwyer graduated from the University of Melbourne in 1961.  She became a solicitor in 1963; and a barrister in 1978. Dwyer was a research assistant for Sir Zelman Cowen and also for Queen Elizabeth II's solicitors in London.

Dwyer was a chairperson of the Equal Opportunity Board (Vic). She also served on the Administrative Appeals Tribunal as a senior member and was a member of Mental Health review board.

Dwyer was awarded the Medal of the Order of Australia in the 2005 Queen's Birthday Honours for "service to the community, particularly through the DEAL Communication Centre and to the law".

Dwyer died in Melbourne on 11 September 2019 after a five-year battle with cancer.

References 

1940 births
2019 deaths
20th-century Australian lawyers
Recipients of the Medal of the Order of Australia
University of Melbourne alumni
Australian women lawyers
21st-century Australian lawyers